"Bubbly" is a song by American rapper Young Thug, Canadian rapper Drake, and American rapper Travis Scott. It was released on October 15, 2021, from the former's second studio album, Punk, as the twelfth track from the album.

Background
On October 20, 2021, American rapper Lil Baby posted a video on TikTok, in which he revealed that he was supposed to be on the song and previewed his verse, but claimed that he forgot to send it to Young Thug.

Composition and lyrics
On the song, Young Thug, Travis Scott, and Drake go in order verse-to-verse. The former starts off the song, boasting about his expensive clothing and jewelry and about women. Travis Scott then comes in, rapping about the same thing. The beat switches as Drake slows down and finishes off the song by continuing with the theme.

Critical reception
Erika Marie from HotNewHipHop felt that "this trio makes perfect sense as they are three leading moguls in the Rap industry with their own labels, clothing lines, and partnerships". Sarah Osei of Highsnobiety placed "Bubbly" at the top of her 60 Songs of the Week chart, claiming the song proves that Young Thug is a "rockstar" as he "drops delirious bars about the dark and twisted realities of fame".

Charts

References

2021 songs
Young Thug songs
Songs written by Young Thug
Drake (musician) songs
Songs written by Drake (musician)
Travis Scott songs
Songs written by Travis Scott
Songs written by Wheezy (record producer)
Songs written by Cardo (record producer)
Song recordings produced by Wheezy (record producer)
Song recordings produced by Cardo (record producer)